Lando may refer to:

People
 Lando (name), a given name or surname of Italian origin
 Pope Lando (913–914)

Other uses
 Lando Calrissian, fictional character in Star Wars
 Landó (music), a style of Peruvian music
 Lando, South Carolina, US
 Lando (horse), German racehorse that won the 1995 Japan Cup

See also
 Herbert v. Lando 441 U.S. 153 (1979), U.S. Supreme Court case involving Anthony Herbert and Barry Lando
 Landau, a town in Germany
 Landi (disambiguation)
 Londo (disambiguation)